Iuliu Barasch or Baraş (17 July 1815 – 31 March 1863) was a Galician-born Jewish physician, philosopher, pedagogue and promoter of Romanian culture and science who made his career in Romania. He played a leading role in disseminating the ideas of the Haskalah, or Jewish Enlightenment, among the Jews of Bucharest.

Biography
Yehuda ben Mordehai Barasch was born in Brody, Galicia (present-day western Ukraine, then in the possession of the Austrian Empire), on 17 July 1815 into a Hasidic family. As a youth he had a traditional Jewish education, before eventually engaging with the ideas of the Haskalah. He studied philosophy from 1836 at the University of Leipzig and in 1839 changed to a doctorate of medicine at the University of Berlin, which he completed in 1841.

Barasch tried to settle in Moldavia, but the authorities refused to give him the licence to practice medicine, so he settled in Wallachia. In 1842, he was a physician in Călăraşi, then in 1845, in Craiova and finally settling in Bucharest. He taught natural sciences at the Saint Sava Academy in 1852 and then was a professor at Bucharest's School of Medicine and Pharmacy.

Beside working as a doctor, he became a radical and ardent Romanian patriot. A friend of C.A. Rosetti and Ion Heliade Rădulescu.

He was a popularizer of medical science and of natural science in general, and the first Jewish Romanian journalist. In 1856—1859 he edited a journal Isis sau Natura (Isis or Nature), the first popular science magazine in Romania. The magazine published studies of astronomy, hypothetical articles about the plurality of worlds or about the most popular inventions of the time, such as aerostat and "submarine ships".

In 1858, Barasch was also the founder of the first children's hospital in Bucharest.

In 1857, together with Aaron Aser and A. Vainberg, Barasch edited Israelitul Român ("The Romanian Israelite"), the first Romanian-language newspaper of the Jewish community in Romania, that was to remain in print for almost 100 years. 

He died in Bucharest on 31 March 1863, at the age of 47. He was buried in Bucharest in the Jewish cemetery on Sevastopol Street. After the abolition of this cemetery in the 1940s during the Ion Antonescu regime, his tomb was moved to the Philanthropy Cemetery and appeared on the List of Historical Monuments in Bucharest (2004). He is memorialized in Bucharest's historically Jewish Văcăreşti neighborhood, where the Baraşeum Theater, now home to the State Jewish Theater, the adjoining Baraşeum clinic, and the street that runs in front of the theater, formerly Ionescu de la Brad, now str. Dr. Iuliu Barasch all being named in his honour.

Publications

Books
Minunile naturei (3 vol., 1852)
Mineralogia, după Belez (1854)
Asfixia sau leşinul (1854)
Botanica, după Belez (1856)
Higiena populară (1857)
Zoologia (1857)
Debora, melodrama (1858)
Cărticica altoiului (1859)
Manual de silvicultură (1861)

Journals
Isis sau Natura (1856-1859)
Natura (1861-1863)
Israelitul Român (1857-)

References

Bibliography 
 The YIVO Encyclopedia of Jews in Eastern Europe 
 Bercovici, Israil, O sută de ani de teatru evreiesc în România ("One hundred years of Yiddish/Jewish theater in Romania"), 2nd Romanian-language edition, revised and augmented by Constantin Măciucă. Editura Integral (an imprint of Editurile Universala), Bucharest (1998), 185. . See the article on the author for further publication information.
 Dimitrie R. Rosetti (1897) Dicţionarul contimporanilor, Editura Lito-Tipografiei "Populara"
 Florin Manolescu, Literatura S.F., Editura Univers, Bucharest, 1980

Romanian magazine editors
Romanian magazine founders
19th-century Romanian physicians
Romanian scientists
Jews from Galicia (Eastern Europe)
1815 births
1863 deaths
19th-century journalists
Male journalists
19th-century male writers
People of the Haskalah